The 2009 San Jose Earthquakes season was the twelfth season of the team's existence, and the second since its revival. The season began with a 1-0 home loss to the New England Revolution on March 21, and ended with a 2-0 loss at the Los Angeles Galaxy on October 24.

Squad

Current squad 
As of August 18, 2009.

Club

Management

Other information

Kits

Competitions

Overall

Results summary

Matches

MLS

U.S. Open Cup qualification

Major League Soccer

Standings

References

External links 

2009 Schedule
San Jose Earthquakes season stats | sjearthquakes.com
San Jose Earthquakes All-time Game Results | Soccerstats.us

2009
San Jose Earthquakes
San Jose Earthquakes
San Jose Earthquakes